Ygor de Oliveira Ferreira (born 1 July 1995), known as Ygor Catatau, is a Brazilian professional footballer who plays as a winger for Sepahan.

Club career
Born in Rio de Janeiro, Ygor was a Madureira youth graduate, having joined the side in 2015 at the age of 20. He made his first team debut on 26 August of that year, playing the last 15 minutes of a 1–1 Copa Rio away draw against Macaé, and scored his first goal on 30 September by netting the second of a 2–0 home win against the same opponent.

After failing to establish himself in the main squad, Ygor spent the 2017 season on loan at Barra da Tijuca, being the club's top goalscorer in the Campeonato Carioca Série B1. Upon returning, he featured more regularly in the 2018 Campeonato Carioca before moving to Boa Esporte also in a temporary deal.

In 2019, Ygor returned to Barra da Tijuca also in a loan deal. He returned to Madureira for the 2020 Campeonato Carioca, scoring three goals in the competition.

On 30 July 2020, still owned by Madureira, Ygor was announced at Série A side Vasco da Gama. He made his debut in the category on 2 September, starting in a 2–2 away draw against Santos.

On 24 September 2021, Mumbai City announced that Ygor had joined the Indian Super League club on a season-long loan. He scored his debut goal for Mumbai against FC Goa on 22 November, in a 3–0 win. He scored his second goal against Bengaluru FC on 4 December, in their 3–1 win.

Career statistics

References

External links
Vasco da Gama profile 

1995 births
Living people
Footballers from Rio de Janeiro (city)
Brazilian footballers
Association football defenders
Campeonato Brasileiro Série A players
Campeonato Brasileiro Série B players
Campeonato Brasileiro Série C players
Campeonato Brasileiro Série D players
Madureira Esporte Clube players
Boa Esporte Clube players
CR Vasco da Gama players
Esporte Clube Vitória players
Sampaio Corrêa Futebol Clube players
Sepahan S.C. footballers
Persian Gulf Pro League players